Trigonidium is a large genus of sword-tail crickets, typical of the tribe Trigonidiini. Records of occurrence are from Europe, Africa, tropical Asia, Australia and the Pacific islands; many species endemic to Pacific islands including Hawaii have now been placed in the genus Nudilla.

Subgenera and Species
The Orthoptera Species File currently lists five subgenera:
Balamara
Auth: Otte & Alexander, 1983 - Australia
Trigonidium albovittatum (Chopard, 1951)
Trigonidium gidya (Otte & Alexander, 1983)
Trigonidium marroo (Otte & Alexander, 1983)
Parametioche
Auth: Otte & Alexander, 1983 - Australia
Trigonidium rectinerve (Chopard, 1951)

Paratrigonidium
Auth: Brunner von Wattenwyl, 1893 - mostly tropical Asia

 Trigonidium castaneum (Brunner von Wattenwyl, 1893)
 Trigonidium chichila (Ingrisch, 2001)
 Trigonidium chloropodum (He, 2017)
 Trigonidium chopardianum (Ebner, 1943)
 Trigonidium coloratum (Caudell, 1927)
 Trigonidium darevskii Gorochov, 1987
 Trigonidium fasciatum (Brunner von Wattenwyl, 1893)
 Trigonidium javanicum (Caudell, 1927)
 Trigonidium majusculum (Karny, 1915)
 Trigonidium nitidum (Brunner von Wattenwyl, 1893)
 Trigonidium striatum (Shiraki, 1911)
 Trigonidium topali Gorochov, 1987
 Trigonidium transversum (Shiraki, 1930)
 Trigonidium unifasciatum (Chopard, 1928)
 Trigonidium venustulum (Saussure, 1878)

Trigonidium
Auth: Rambur, 1838 - Europe, Africa, Asia, Australia, Pacific islands

 Trigonidium ahiu Otte, 1994
 Trigonidium amarina Otte & Alexander, 1983
 Trigonidium australiana (Chopard, 1925)
 Trigonidium brevipenne Saussure, 1899
 Trigonidium bundilla Otte & Alexander, 1983
 Trigonidium canara Otte & Alexander, 1983
 Trigonidium canberrae Otte & Alexander, 1983
 Trigonidium cicindeloides Rambur, 1838 - type species
 Trigonidium erythrocephalum (Walker, 1869)
 Trigonidium goobita Otte & Alexander, 1983
 Trigonidium guineense (Saussure, 1878)
 Trigonidium humbertianum (Saussure, 1878)
 Trigonidium infuscata (Chopard, 1925)
 Trigonidium inopinum Otte & Cowper, 2007
 Trigonidium killawarra Otte & Alexander, 1983
 Trigonidium lalwinya Otte & Alexander, 1983
 Trigonidium meekappa Otte & Alexander, 1983
 Trigonidium nigritum (Saussure, 1899)
 Trigonidium novarae (Saussure, 1878)
 Trigonidium parinervis (Chopard, 1925)
 Trigonidium rubellonigrum Gorochov, 1987
 Trigonidium solis Tan, Baroga-Barbecho & Yap, 2019

Trigonidomorpha
Auth: Chopard, 1925 - Africa, India, Australia

 Trigonidium ammonga (Otte & Alexander, 1983)
 Trigonidium basilewskyi (Chopard, 1955)
 Trigonidium fuscifrons (Chopard, 1936)
 Trigonidium kundui (Bhowmik, 1971)
 Trigonidium lineatifrons (Chopard, 1935)
 Trigonidium obscuripennis (Chopard, 1957)
 Trigonidium pallidipennis (Chopard, 1962)
 Trigonidium pallipes (Chopard, 1938)
 Trigonidium pubescens (Chopard, 1954)
 Trigonidium sjostedti (Chopard, 1925)
 Trigonidium vittata (Chopard, 1954)

References

Crickets
Ensifera genera
Trigonidiinae